WXMA (102.3 FM) is a commercial radio station in Louisville, Kentucky.  It is owned by Alpha Media and broadcasts a soft adult contemporary radio format known as "102.3 The Rose".  WXMA's radio studios and offices are on South 4th Street in Downtown Louisville.

WXMA has an effective radiated power (ERP) of 6,000 watts.  The transmitter site is atop The 800 Apartments building, a few blocks from the studios.

Station history
102.3 FM signed on as WLRS in 1964 as a stand-alone FM station for Louisville Radio School (hence the call-letters for the station). The station was used as a training ground for the school's broadcast students in its early years. In the late 1960s, station owner Clarence Henson entered into an agreement to sell WLRS to crosstown AM Top 40 WAKY, but the deal fell apart when WAKY did not meet the six-month deadline to complete the transaction. By 1970, WLRS was noted as being one of only nine stand-alone FMs in the state of Kentucky.

WLRS went to first place in the Arbitron ratings in 1978. By that time, the station was album rock, a format that the station had adopted for many years.

However, by 1981, WLRS was beaten by rival album rock station WQMF in the ratings, and in 1984, the station switched to a Top 40/AOR format or CHR for short as "The Flamethrowing LRS 102". The station was adding pop and urban artists like Michael Jackson and Whitney Houston to its playlist (while still leaning toward Rock), to fill the void left when WKJJ abandoned Top 40 for adult contemporary in 1982 and WJYL dropped Top 40 for urban contemporary in 1984. Eventually, WKJJ switched back to CHR as WDJX, and both WLRS and WDJX (which leaned more toward R&B and dance) battled each other for the next few years before WLRS evolved back to their album rock format in 1986, because, at that time, LRS' ratings were poor. The station would later flip back to Top 40/CHR in 1988.

On December 26, 1990, at 2 a.m., WLRS began stunting with Macintosh's Talking Moose counting down from 70,000 to 1. On January 1, 1991, at approximately 9:27 a.m., WLRS flipped to adult contemporary as "Mix 102". The first song on "Mix" was "This Is It" by Kenny Loggins. The station still used the legal calls of WLRS, but despite this, complemented its branding with the fake calls, "WMIX". However, the "WMIX" branding was dropped by June 1991, as Withers Broadcasting, which owns two actual WMIX stations in Mount Vernon, Illinois (WMIX AM and WMIX-FM), registered the "WMIX" branding as a registered trademark, and had threatened WLRS with a Cease and Desist letter for use of a trademark without permission.

On May 19, 1997, at 6 p.m., after playing "The Last Song" by Edward Bear, WLRS began stunting with a loop of "I Am the Walrus" by The Beatles, as well as promotions for other Louisville radio stations and teaser formats. One of the teaser formats was country as "Hot Country 102, The Bull". On May 26, at 1:02 p.m., WLRS flipped to alternative rock as "LRS 102.3". The first song on "LRS" was "Spoonman" by Soundgarden.

On July 30, 1999, at 3 p.m., WLRS flipped to soft adult contemporary as "Love 102.3" under the WULV call letters. (The WLRS call letters would be resurrected on 105.1 FM in February 2000, with that station featuring an active rock format.)

On May 17, 2002, WULV flipped to Hot AC as "102.3 The Max" WXMA.

On August 31, 2017, at Noon, WXMA changed formats to adult hits, branded as "102.3 Jack FM".

On August 30, 2022, at Noon, WXMA flipped back to soft AC, this time branded as "102.3 The Rose".

References

External links
102.3 The Rose official website

XMA
Radio stations established in 1964
Alpha Media radio stations
1964 establishments in Kentucky
Soft adult contemporary radio stations in the United States